The Kausala railway station is located in the municipality of Iitti, Finland, in the urban area and municipal seat of Kausala. It is located along the Lahti–Kouvola railway, and its neighboring stations are Uusikylä in the west and Koria in the east.

Services 
Kausala is served by all commuter trains on the route Lahti–Kouvola, and some of these services are operated from or continue towards Kotka as well. The intermediate stations between Lahti and Kouvola are also served by all but one  rush hour service on the route Helsinki–Lahti–Kouvola. Westbound trains towards Lahti and Helsinki stop at track 1 and eastbound trains towards Kouvola and Kotka use track 2.

References 

Iitti
Knut Nylander railway stations
Railway stations opened in 1870
Railway stations in Päijät-Häme